State Highway 12 (West Bengal) is a state highway in West Bengal, India.

Route
SH 12 originates from Naxalbari and passes through Kharibari, Phansidewa, Matigara, Mirik, Sukhiapokhri, Ghum, Peshok, Teesta Valley, Kalimpong, Algarah, Labha, Gorubathan. Damdim, Chalsa, Madarihat, Falakata, Sonapur before terminating to NH-27 through Kamakhyaguri  Alipurduar. 

The total length of SH 12 is 352 km.

Districts traversed by SH 12 are: Darjeeling district, Kalimpong district, Jalpaiguri district, Alipurduar district.

Road sections
It is divided into different sections as follows:.

See also
List of state highways in West Bengal

References

State Highways in West Bengal
Transport in Alipurduar